Lansing Holden may refer to:

Lansing C. Holden, an architect
Lansing Colton Holden Jr., an aviator